John Judah Glass (October 31, 1895 – September 21, 1973) was a politician in Ontario, Canada. He represented St. Andrew in the Legislative Assembly of Ontario from 1934 to 1943 as a Liberal member.

Background
Glass was born in Lachva, Russia. The son of Morris Glass and Pearl Chafers, he came to Canada in 1907. Glass was educated in Toronto, at Toronto University and Osgoode Hall. He served in the Canadian Expeditionary Force during World War I. Glass was called to the bar in 1920. In 1929, he married Anne Ethel Horowitz.

Politics
He served on the Board of Education and was a Toronto alderman from 1931 to 1934. Glass ran unsuccessfully for a seat in the Ontario legislative assembly in 1929. He was elected in 1934 as a Liberal and served in the Ontario legislature until 1943 when he was defeated by J. B. Salsberg of the Labor-Progressive Party.

In 1932, while on city council, Glass was chairman of the city's parks commission, he attempted to eliminate "Gentiles only" signs by forbidding the erection of any signs on city property without the commission's approval.

Provincial election results: St. Andrew

References

External links

1895 births
1973 deaths
Canadian military personnel of World War I
Jewish Canadian politicians
Ontario Liberal Party MPPs
Osgoode Hall Law School alumni
Toronto city councillors
University of Toronto alumni
Emigrants from the Russian Empire to Canada